Ferdinando Monfardini (born 20 November 1984 in Isola della Scala) is an Italian race car driver. He raced in the 2005 and 2006 GP2 Series seasons, having previously raced in the Formula 3000 series which it replaced.

Career
Monfardini started out in 1994, competing in karting like many of his GP2 rivals. He stayed there until 2000, debuting in Italian Formula Renault in 2001. He would stay there in 2002, also driving in Formula Renault 2000 Eurocup. He again raced in Italian Formula Renault in 2003, driving two races in both 2000 Eurocup and Formula 3000, the latter being with the BCN team.

In 2004 he drove the full F3000 season for the AEZ team, and in 2005 was one of a select few GP2 Series drivers with a full season of F3000 experience behind them. He drove for the Durango team as the number two to Clivio Piccione, moving to the Coloni team at the end of the season, essentially switching places with compatriot Gianmaria Bruni.  For 2006 he moved to the DAMS team, but only scored one more point than in the previous season and was not retained beyond the end of the year.

For 2007, he raced in the GT1 class of the FIA GT Championship, driving an Aston Martin DBR9.  For 2008, he is driving a Ferrari 430 in the GTA class of the International GT Open.

Racing record

Complete International Formula 3000 results
(key) (Races in bold indicate pole position; races in italics indicate fastest lap.)

Complete GP2 Series results
(key) (Races in bold indicate pole position) (Races in italics indicate fastest lap)

Complete Formula Renault 3.5 Series results 
(key) (Races in bold indicate pole position) (Races in italics indicate fastest lap)

References
Career statistics from driverdb.com, retrieved on July 2, 2008.

External links
Official website

1984 births
Living people
GP2 Series drivers
Italian racing drivers
Italian Formula Renault 2.0 drivers
Formula Renault Eurocup drivers
International Formula 3000 drivers
FIA GT Championship drivers
World Series Formula V8 3.5 drivers
International GT Open drivers
24 Hours of Spa drivers

Aston Martin Racing drivers
DAMS drivers
Durango drivers
Scuderia Coloni drivers